The Hotel Courtland in Canton, Ohio, also or formerly known as St. Francis Hotel and as Stark County Office Building, was built in 1905.  It was designed by architect Guy Tilden.

It was listed on the National Register of Historic Places in 1987.

References

Hotel buildings on the National Register of Historic Places in Ohio
Renaissance Revival architecture in Ohio
Hotel buildings completed in 1905
Buildings and structures in Canton, Ohio
Hotels in Ohio
National Register of Historic Places in Stark County, Ohio
1905 establishments in Ohio